Pletcher, also known as Brookson, is an unincorporated community in Chilton County, Alabama, United States.

History
The community was originally known as Brookson in honor of A. M. Brookson, who helped with the construction of the Mobile and Ohio Railroad. The name was then changed to Pletcher in honor of a Mr. E. Pletcher, who operated a local sawmill.

A post office operated under the name Pletcher from 1898 to 1956.

References

Unincorporated communities in Chilton County, Alabama
Unincorporated communities in Alabama